DYSL (105.3 FM) branded as 105.3 Radyo Natin Hinoba - an is a music FM radio station which owned by Manila Broadcasting Company that broadcasts from John Paul Bldg. Brgy. Bacuyangan, Hinoba-an, Negros Occidental in the Philippines. (Formerly at the Bilbao Drive)

Broadcasting with a power of 500 Watts from 4am to 12mn. It is the first FM station in Hinoba-an, Negros Occidental, Philippines.

History
On December 16, 1997, MBC launched Radyo Natin. Composed of 100 FM stations strategically across the nation by using state of the art satellite technology, Radyo Natin is able to reach audiences that has never been reached before by another radio station.

The RN Hinoba-an is managed under the Airwaves Advertising from the start up to the closure of the said station.

Shutdown of Radyo Natin Hinoba-an
On March 1, 2013 The station manager of the Radyo Natin 105.3 FM in Hinoba-an town hit the Mayor of Hinoba-an for padlocking the station and called media groups to help fight modern day oppressors.

In a press conference held at the Negros Press Club office here, station manager of RNH said the shutdown of their station was allegedly done sans due process and was a clear repression  of the freedom of the press.

The station manager said Radyo Natin was padlocked per instruction from the mayor of Hinoba-an last March 1, 2013. It was implemented while he was out of town.

Based on reports, mayor of Hinoba-an said the radio station it has no mayor’s permit since 2010 which RN Hinoba-an Station Manager denied.

form the source of The Daily Guardian.

The Return of the Station
On 2015 the Radyo Natin Hinoba-an has return to its broadcasting operations under by the new management the JMV Broadcasting Ventures which the sister station in Hinigaran, the 105.7 Radyo Natin Hinigaran.

References

Radio stations established in 1997
Radyo Natin Network stations
Radio stations in Negros Occidental